Adeuomphalus guillei is a species of sea snail, a marine gastropod mollusc unassigned to family in the superfamily Seguenzioidea.

Description

Distribution

References

guillei
Gastropods described in 2009